A1A or A-1-A is the fifth studio album by American popular music singer-songwriter Jimmy Buffett and the third major label album in Buffett's Don Gant-produced "Key West phase."  It was initially released in December 1974 as Dunhill DS-50183 and later re-released on Dunhill's successor labels ABC and MCA.

The album is named for Florida State Road A1A that runs mostly along the Atlantic Ocean and is the main road through most oceanfront towns.  It is also referenced in the song "Trying To Reason With Hurricane Season".  The album's original back cover is a photograph of a section of A1A.

Chart performance
The album reached No. 25 on the Billboard 200 album chart but did not make the country chart.  Singles included "A Pirate Looks at Forty" (b/w "Presents to Send You") released in February 1975 and "Door Number Three" (b/w "Dallas") in July 1975 which reached No. 88 on the Billboard Hot Country Singles chart.

Songs
Seven of the songs were written by Buffett alone. "Door Number Three," a novelty song about the game show Let's Make a Deal, was co-written by Buffett with Steve Goodman while "Dallas" was written by Coral Reefer Band guitarist Roger Bartlett.  There are also two covers of songs from songwriters not associated with Buffett : "Stories We Could Tell" from John Sebastian's 1974 album Tarzana Kid and "Making Music for Money" originally written by Alex Harvey for The First Edition's 1974 album I'm Not Making Music For Money.

The album's songs are typical of Buffett's music in the early and mid-1970s. The music is heavily country oriented with Buffett backed by the Third Coral Reefer Band with a number of Nashville session musicians. Likewise, several of the songs (the entire second side of the album) are nautical-themed, a feature of Buffett's music following his move to Key West, Florida.

The lyrics of "Nautical Wheelers" refer to "living & dying in ¾ time", the title of Buffett's previous album; and the song actually is in ¾ time signature.

Record World said that "a new twist to Let's Make a Deal turns ['Door Number Three'] into a portal opener full of fun and profit."

Critical and commercial reception

Although it was not extremely commercially successful at the time of its release, A1A is generally considered one of Buffett's better albums.  Reviewer Vik Iyengar of Allmusic calls A1A "one of Jimmy Buffett's classic '70s albums that established his persona, and it is a perfect introduction to his music."  "A Pirate Looks at Forty" from the album appears on all of Buffett's major greatest hits collections and is a perennial concert favorite, one of "The Big 8" that he has allegedly played at almost every concert.

Track listing 

Side A
"Making Music for Money" (Alex Harvey) 4:01
"Door Number Three" (Jimmy Buffett, Steve Goodman) 3:03
"Dallas" (Roger Bartlett) 3:25
"Presents to Send You" (Jimmy Buffett) 2:40
"Stories We Could Tell" (John B. Sebastian) 3:18
"Life Is Just a Tire Swing" (Jimmy Buffett) 3:04
Side B
"A Pirate Looks at Forty" (Jimmy Buffett) 3:57
"Migration" (Jimmy Buffett) 4:13
"Trying to Reason with Hurricane Season" (Jimmy Buffett) 4:21
"Nautical Wheelers" (Jimmy Buffett) 3:35
"Tin Cup Chalice" (Jimmy Buffett) 3:38

Personnel
The Third Coral Reefer Band
Jimmy Buffett - vocals, guitar
Roger Bartlett - acoustic lead and road band
Steve Goodman - acoustic lead guitar
Reggie Young - electric lead guitar
Doyle Gresham - pedal steel
Greg "Fingers" Taylor - harmonica
Tommy Cogbill - bass
Mike Utley - piano, organ
Farrell Morris - percussion
Sammy Creason - drums
Buzz Cason, Bergen White, Don Gant - background vocals

Notes

Jimmy Buffett albums
1974 albums
Albums produced by Don Gant